Markéta is a feminine Czech given name, equivalent to English Margaret. Notable people with the name include:

Markéta Hajdu (born 1974), Czech hammer thrower
Markéta Irglová (born 1988), Czech musician and actress
Markéta Jánská (born 1981), Czech model
Markéta Vondroušová (born 1999), Czech tennis player
Markéta Štroblová (born 1988), Czech pornographic actress

Czech feminine given names